{{DISPLAYTITLE:C6H6N4O4}}
The molecular formula C6H6N4O4 (molar mass: 198.14 g/mol, exact mass: 198.0389 u) may refer to:

 2,4-Dinitrophenylhydrazine
 Nitrofurazone